Thawiwatthana Football Club, better known as old name Sriracha FC, is a Thai professional football club based in Nakhon Pathom.

The club combines Thawiwatthana F.C. from Khǒr Royal Cup plays their home games at the Suan Sunandha Rajabhat University Salaya Campus Stadium (Salaya Campus) in Nakhon Pathom. They traditionally play in pink and blue. The club's official logo has a king cobra on it, hence their nickname is Killer King Cobra.

Yo-Yo Club
The club has somewhat become known as a yo-yo club in the Thai football scene, being relegated and promoted to and from the top flight on five successive occasions between 2008 and 2012. The sequence was broken in 2012 when they finished one place off the promotion spots in the 2012 Division 1 race.

Stadium and locations by season records

Season by season record

P = Played
W = Games won
D = Games drawn
L = Games lost
F = Goals for
A = Goals against
Pts = Points
Pos = Final position

TPL = Thai Premier League

QR1 = First Qualifying Round
QR2 = Second Qualifying Round
QR3 = Third Qualifying Round
QR4 = Fourth Qualifying Round
RInt = Intermediate Round
R1 = Round 1
R2 = Round 2
R3 = Round 3

R4 = Round 4
R5 = Round 5
R6 = Round 6
GR = Group stage
QF = Quarter-finals
SF = Semi-finals
RU = Runners-up
S = Shared
W = Winners

Honours

Domestic leagues
 Thailand Division 1 League:
 Winners (1):  2010
 Runners-up (1): 2008

References

External links 
 Taweewattana news
 - YouTube
 

Association football clubs established in 2005
Football clubs in Thailand
Sport in Chonburi province
2005 establishments in Thailand